Sir Frederick John Falkiner, 1st Baronet (8 April 1768 – 14 September 1824) was an Irish baronet and politician.

He was the eldest son of Daniel Falkiner, grandson of Daniel Falkiner, and his wife Dorothy Faure, daughter of Henry Faure. Falkiner was educated at Trinity College, Dublin and graduated with a Bachelor of Arts. In 1804, he raised the 100th Regiment of Foot, and one year later, after the authorisation of King George III of the United Kingdom and the integration into the British Army, he became its colonel.

In 1791, Falkiner was elected to the Irish House of Commons for Athy and sat for it until 1798. Subsequently he was returned for Dublin County until the Act of Union in 1801 and thereafter for Dublin County to the British House of Commons until 1807. He stood for Carlow Borough in 1812 and represented the constituency until 1818. Falkiner was secretary to the Order of St Patrick, and was appointed High Sheriff of County Dublin in 1801. On 21 December 1812, he was created a baronet, of Abbotstown, in the County of Dublin.

On 23 October 1798, he married Anne Frances Gardiner, daughter of Sackville Gardiner. Falkiner died without issue and the baronetcy became extinct.

References

External links

1768 births
1824 deaths
Alumni of Trinity College Dublin
Baronets in the Baronetage of the United Kingdom
Irish MPs 1790–1797
Irish MPs 1798–1800
Members of the Parliament of Ireland (pre-1801) for County Dublin constituencies
Members of the Parliament of Ireland (pre-1801) for County Kildare constituencies
Members of the Parliament of the United Kingdom for County Carlow constituencies (1801–1922)
Members of the Parliament of the United Kingdom for County Dublin constituencies (1801–1922)
UK MPs 1801–1802
UK MPs 1802–1806
UK MPs 1806–1807
UK MPs 1812–1818
High Sheriffs of County Dublin